"Ex" is a song by American singer Ty Dolla Sign, released on October 6, 2017. It is the third single from his second studio album Beach House 3 (2017) and features American rapper YG. Produced by BongoByTheWay, Hitmaka and Ty Dolla Sign, the song samples the remix of "Only You" by 112.

Composition and lyrics
The song is about the artists' disloyalty and their exes. It opens with Ty Dolla Sign referencing "Where I Wanna Be" by Donell Jones in the chorus: "I just text my main chick (main) / I told her I ain't coming home (home) / I just text my main chick (main) / I told her I ain't coming home, tonight (home)". He "gets to the heart of his plan" in the first verse, singing, "Mixing Henny with the Bombay (Bomb') / Fuck it, I done had a long day (oh) / I done linked up with my old thing / Right time, but the wrong place". YG then raps about his single life, on jet skis with "naked" women ("Leave your main squeeze for these naked bitches, yeah / That's how, you know, when it's all bad / She call me, I text her I could call back / But she imagine in her head I'm doing all that").

Critical reception
Kevin Goddard of HotNewHipHop wrote that Ty Dolla Sign "delivers a radio-friendly club banger that finds him addressing relationship issues with his 'ex' girl." Vice Media called the song a "breezy piece of libidinous R&B that mostly involves Ty Dolla $ign mixing drinks and thinking about hooking back up with a former lover".

Music video
The music video was released on January 18, 2018. Directed by David Camarena, it finds Ty Dolla Sign cruising through a city in a vintage car with hydraulics, then entering a party surrounded by many women, before he is seen in a room bathed in red lights with a woman wearing lingerie waits for him. Ty later meets up with YG, as they show off old-school cars and go partying.

Charts

Certifications

References

2017 singles
2017 songs
Atlantic Records singles
Ty Dolla Sign songs
Songs written by Ty Dolla Sign
YG (rapper) songs
Songs written by YG (rapper)
Songs written by Slim (singer)
Songs written by Quinnes Parker
Songs written by Donell Jones
Songs written by Daron Jones
Songs written by Sean Combs
Songs written by Stevie J
Songs written by the Notorious B.I.G.